"Such a Good Feeling" is a song by English electronic music trio Brothers in Rhythm, released as a single only. It samples Charvoni's "Always There" which itself is a cover of a Side Effect song from 1976 (which was a bigger hit for Incognito in 1991). The original lyrics for "Always There", written by Paul B Allen III, were sampled, and different music was sampled by Brothers in Rhythm to play underneath those vocalized lyrics. Upon its first release, it reached No. 64 on the UK Singles Chart and No. 1 on the US Billboard Hot Dance Music/Club Play chart. After a re-release the same year, it reached No. 14 in the UK. On the Eurochart Hot 100, "Such a Good Feeling" reached number 43. Mixmag ranked the song number 49 in its '100 Greatest Dance Singles of All Time' list in 1996.

Critical reception
Larry Flick from Billboard viewed "Such a Good Feeling" as a "tasty slice of pop/house", and "hot diva-disco [that] blends spacy synth swirls with a busy beat-base and dramatic vocal snatches." He noted that "wriggling bass line surrounds and captivates, while well-placed samples and sax fills provide a bright and festive tone." British electronic dance and clubbing magazine Mixmag commented, "For a while back in 1991, when being a cheesy quaver meant the music really was pretty cheesy, when half the nation's ravers liked 'ardcore and the other were up for happy dappy Italian house, this tune united us all in the kind of hugged up joy you can only look back on with a smile. A crafty vocal steal gave us all the kind of simplistic but oh-so-meaningful message you need when you're wazzed off your knackers, stripped to the waist on a podium kind of thing." James Hamilton from Music Week described the track as a "Black Box type galloper".

Music video
A music video was produced to promote the single.

Track listing
7" single

12" single

Charts

References

External links
 Brothers In Rhythm - Such A Good Feeling on Discogs

1991 songs
1991 singles
British electronic songs
British house music songs
Song articles with missing songwriters
4th & B'way Records singles